The Canton of Ribérac is a canton of the Dordogne département, in France. At the French canton reorganisation which came into effect in March 2015, the canton of Ribérac was expanded from 13 to 35 communes (4 of which merged into the new communes La Tour-Blanche-Cercles and La Jemaye-Ponteyraud):
 
Allemans
Bertric-Burée
Bourg-des-Maisons
Bourg-du-Bost
Bouteilles-Saint-Sébastien
Celles
Champagne-et-Fontaine
La Chapelle-Grésignac
La Chapelle-Montabourlet
Chassaignes
Cherval
Comberanche-et-Épeluche
Coutures
Gout-Rossignol
La Jemaye-Ponteyraud
Lusignac
Nanteuil-Auriac-de-Bourzac
Petit-Bersac
Ribérac
Saint-André-de-Double
Saint-Martial-Viveyrol
Saint-Martin-de-Ribérac
Saint-Méard-de-Drône
Saint-Pardoux-de-Drône
Saint-Paul-Lizonne
Saint-Sulpice-de-Roumagnac
Saint-Vincent-de-Connezac
Siorac-de-Ribérac
La Tour-Blanche-Cercles
Vanxains
Vendoire
Verteillac
Villetoureix

See also 
 Cantons of the Dordogne department

References

Cantons of Dordogne